The Minister of Transport and Communications is a senior member of the Constitutional Government of East Timor heading the Ministry of Transport and Communications.

Functions
Under the Constitution of East Timor, the Minister has the power and the duty:

Where the Minister is in charge of the subject matter of a government statute, the Minister is also required, together with the Prime Minister, to sign the statute.

Incumbent
The incumbent Minister of Transport and Communications is José Agustinho da Silva. He is assisted by Merício Juvenal dos Reis "Akara", Secretary of State for Communications.

List of Ministers 
The following individuals have been appointed as the Minister:

References

External links
  – official site

Transport and Communications